Devin Davis (born March 29, 1995) is an American professional basketball player for Napoli Basket of the Italian Lega Basket Serie A (LBA). He played college basketball for Indiana, Odessa College and Houston.

High school career
Davis attended Warren Central High School in Indianapolis, Indiana.

College career
 
Davis began his collegiate career at Indiana. He was involved in a serious car accident that left him hospitalized in November 2014. In May 2015, he was dismissed from Indiana after being cited for possession of marijuana. Davis transferred to Odessa College in Texas. He earned junior college All-American honors while averaging 16.8 points and 8.2 rebounds per game. Davis transferred to Houston, choosing the Cougars over offers from Iowa State, Temple, Cincinnati, Purdue and Ole Miss. He averaged 8.3 points and 5.3 rebounds per game as a junior but struggled with injuries. As a senior, Davis averaged 10.9 points and 6.3 rebounds per game.

Professional career
After going undrafted in the 2018 NBA draft Davis joined the Lakeland Magic of the NBA G League. 

In August 2019, he joined Lavrio of the Greek Basket League. On August 3, 2020, he renewed his contract with the Greek club. During the very successful for the club 2020–21 season, where they reached the Greek Basket League finals for the first time, Davis averaged 10.6 points, 5 rebounds, 0.8 assists, 1.1 steals, and 0.6 blocks, shooting with 49% from beyond the arc, in 33 games, playing 23.5 minutes per contest. 

On July 13, 2021, Davis officially signed with French LNB Pro A club ESSM Le Portel. In 33 games, he averaged 12.3 points and 5.6 rebounds, playing around 27 minutes per contest.

On June 27, 2022, Davis returned to Greece, signing with Basketball Champions League club Peristeri. On November 10 of the same year, he mutually parted ways with the team. In 5 domestic games, he averaged 7.4 points and 4.4 rebounds, while in 3 BCL matches, he posted an average of 9 points and 3 rebounds per contest.

On November 15, 2022, he signed with Napoli Basket of the Italian Lega Basket Serie A to replace Greek center Dimitrios Agravanis. He made his debut on November 20, 2022 when he scored 13 points and got 8 rebounds in 22 minutes in a win against Universo Treviso Basket.

Career statistics

College

|-
| style="text-align:left;"|2013–14
| style="text-align:left;"|Indiana
| 29 || 1 || 8.8 || .529 || .000 || .667 || 2.6 || 0.0 || .2 || .4 || 2.4
|-
| style="text-align:left;"|2016–17
| style="text-align:left;"|Houston
| 20 || 13 || 20.9 || .458 || .250 || .571 || 3.5 || 1.0 || .7 || .5 || 8.3
|-
| style="text-align:left;"|2017–18
| style="text-align:left;"|Houston
| 35 || 35 || 26.0 || .488 || .143 || .680 || 4.7 || 1.3 || .7 || .7 || 10.9
|- class="sortbottom"
| style="text-align:center;" colspan="2"|Career
| 84 || 49 || 18.8 || .484 || .182 || .644 || 4.7 || 0.8 || 0.5 || .6 || 7.3

References

External links
Houston Cougars bio
RealGM profile
EuroBasket profile

1995 births
Living people
American expatriate basketball people in France
American expatriate basketball people in Greece
American men's basketball players
Basketball players from Indiana
Centers (basketball)
ESSM Le Portel players
Houston Cougars men's basketball players
Indiana Hoosiers men's basketball players
Lavrio B.C. players
Napoli Basket players
Odessa Wranglers men's basketball players
Peristeri B.C. players
Power forwards (basketball)